Klio (minor planet designation: 84 Klio) is a fairly large and very dark main-belt asteroid. It was discovered by R. Luther on August 25, 1865, and named after Clio, the Muse of history in Greek mythology. The name Clio had previously been suggested by the discoverer of 12 Victoria, and that is the name B. A. Gould, editor of the prestigious Astronomical Journal, adopted for that asteroid, because of the controversy over the name Victoria.
An occultation by Klio over a dim star was observed on April 2, 1997.

Photometric observations of this asteroid during 2007 at the Organ Mesa Observatory in Las Cruces, New Mexico were used to create a light curve plot. This showed a synodic rotation period of 23.562 ± 0.001 hours and a brightness variation of 0.21 ± 0.02 magnitude during each cycle.

Perturbation
Perturbations of asteroid 52 Europa by 84 Klio suggest that 52 Europa would have a mass as high as 1.68 kg.  But this would require Europa to have an unrealistic density of 10.6 g/cm3.  Further observations of Klio will be needed to properly refine the mass of both asteroid Europa and Klio.

References

External links 
 
 

Klio asteroids
Klio
Klio
G-type asteroids (Tholen)
Ch-type asteroids (SMASS)
18650825